Kya Meri Sonam Gupta Bewafa Hai? ( Is my Sonam Gupta unfaithful?) is a 2021 Indian Hindi-language comedy film written and directed by Ssaurabh Tyagi and produced by Dhaval Jayantilal Gada and Aksshay Jayantilal Gada under the banner Pen India Limited. It features Jassie Gill and Surbhi Jyoti in lead roles. Alongside late Surekha Sikri, Vijay Raaz, Kaviraj Laique, Brijendra Kala and Atul Shrivastava. The film premiered on 10 September 2021 on ZEE5.

Cast 
 Jassie Gill as Sintu
 Surbhi Jyoti as Sonam Gupta
 Surekha Sikri as Dadi
 Vijay Raaz as Sanjeev Nagraj
 Kaviraj Laique as Kundan
 Brijendra Kala as Sonam's father
 Atul Shrivastava as Sintu's father
 Rajesh Sharma as Travel Agent 
 Saaki as Sintu's friend
 Manjeet Singh Rathore as Sintu's friend

Soundtrack 

The songs featured in the film are composed by Rahul Mishra, Rochak Kohli, Payal Dev and Avvy Sra while lyrics are written by Happy Raikoti, Manoj Muntashir and Rahul Mishra.

References

External links 
 Kya Meri Sonam Gupta Bewafa Hai? at ZEE5
 

2021 films
2021 comedy films
Films scored by Rochak Kohli
Films scored by Payal Dev
Indian comedy films
2020s Hindi-language films